The following is a list of massacres that have occurred in Haiti (numbers may be approximate):

Massacres

See also 
 Fort Dimanche   
 Crime in Haiti
 Volontaires de la Sécurité Nationale (Haitian secret police)

References 

Haiti
Massacres

Massacres